Oithonidae is a family of copepods belonging to the order Cyclopoida.

Genera:
 Dioithona Kiefer, 1935
 Oithona Baird, 1843
 Pontoeciella

References

Copepods